Dimitris Tsiogas (born 1956 in Dolichi, Elassona - died 2010 in Larissa) was a Greek politician.

In 1975 he became a member of the Communist Youth of Greece. He was a member of the Central Committee of the Communist Party of Greece since its 18th Congress in 2008.

He was elected to the Greek Parliament in 2001 after replacing . He was reelected in the 2004 and 2007 elections. He resigned from his position in 2008, being replaced by Antonis Skyllakos.

He died in 2010 from cancer.

References

1956 births
2010 deaths
Communist Party of Greece politicians
Greek MPs 2000–2004
Greek MPs 2004–2007
Greek MPs 2007–2009
Deaths from cancer in Greece
People from Larissa (regional unit)